The Queen in Waiting: The Columbia Years (1960–1965) is a 2002 compilation album of Aretha Franklin's early recordings from 1960 to 1965 when she was signed to Columbia Records. It was repackaged as part of The Essential series in 2010, with a three-disc set containing eight additional songs also being released as The Essential 3.0.

Background
The Queen in Waiting highlights Franklin's jazz and big-band recordings with Columbia before she became famous after she moved to Atlantic Records. Not knowing how to best utilize Franklin's talent, her producers had her record a mixture of jazz, blues, gospel, pop, and soul, and Columbia was criticized for mismanaging Franklin during her tenure with them. Collections such as this one and the more comprehensive Take a Look: Aretha Franklin Complete on Columbia are attempts to bring exposure to Franklin's catalog of early recordings.

Track listing

Disc one

Disc two

Limited edition 3.0

Release history

References

External links 
Aretha Franklin - The Queen in Waiting: The Columbia Years (1960–1965), ArethaFranklin.net

Aretha Franklin compilation albums
2002 compilation albums
Columbia Records compilation albums
Legacy Recordings compilation albums